This article presents detailed results of the 2012 Japanese general election. It lists all elected Representatives in the 300 single-member districts and the 11 regional proportional representation (PR) blocks. Subsequent by-elections and the PR block replacement candidates to be elected later without additional vote in cases of death, resignation or disqualification (kuriage-tōsen) are not listed.

District results only for winner, runner-up and any other candidate above 20% of the vote, format: Candidate (Party – endorsing parties) vote share. Endorsements by parties that have not nominated any candidates themselves (e.g. Okinawa Socialist Mass Party, Green Party) are not included. Party affiliations as of election day, subject to change at any time, composition may have already changed by the opening session of the first post-election Diet (see the List of members of the Diet of Japan).

Party names are abbreviated as follows (format: abbreviation used here, Japanese name, English translation, English name):
 Ruling coalition
 DPJ Minshutō, "Democratic Party", Democratic Party of Japan
 PNP Kokumin Shintō, People's New Party
 Opposition parties
 LDP Jiyūminshutō, "Liberal Democratic Party", Liberal Democratic Party of Japan
 TPJ Nippon Mirai no Tō, "Japan Future Party", Tomorrow Party of Japan
 NK Kōmeitō, "Justice Party", New Komeito
 JRP Nippon Ishin no Kai, "Japan renewal assembly", Japan Restoration Party
 JCP Nihon Kyōsantō, Japanese Communist Party
 YP Minna no Tō, "Everybody's Party", Your Party
 SDP Shakaiminshutō, Social Democratic Party
 NPD Shintō Daichi – Shin-Minshu, "New Party Daichi – True Democrats", New Party Daichi-Shinminshu
 NRP Shintō Kaikaku, "New Reform Party", New Renaissance Party
 NPN Shintō Nippon, "New Party Japan", New Party Nippon
 Other minor parties with candidates
 HRP Kōfuku-jitsugen-tō, Happiness Realization Party
 Ainu Ainu Minzoku-tō, "Ainu People Party", Ainu Party
 Atarimae Atarimae-tō, Natural Party
 WECP Sekai-keizai-kyōdōtai-tō, World Economic Community Party
 Euthanasia Anrakushi-tō, "Euthanasia Party"
 21Ishin Nijuisseiki Nihon Ishin Kai
 I Independents

Hokkaidō

Tōhoku

Northern Kantō

Southern Kantō

Tokyo

Hokuriku-Shin'etsu

Tōkai

Kinki

Chūgoku

Shikoku

Kyūshū

References 
 Main source
 Yomiuri Shimbun: 衆院選2012
 2012 House of Representatives election district and block results from other major Japanese newspapers
 Asahi Shimbun: 第46回総選挙
 Nihon Keizai Shimbun: 衆院選2012
 Mainichi Shimbun: 2012衆院選
 msn/Sankei Shimbun: 衆院選2012

Japanese general election, 2012 Results
General elections in Japan
Election results in Japan